Silver Service is a brand applied by Amtrak to its long-distance trains running along the United States East Coast between New York City and Miami, Florida. It comprises two trains:
Silver Meteor
Silver Star

The two services follow the same general route between New York City and Miami, but diverge between Selma, NC and Savannah, GA, as well as at Auburndale, FL. The Silver Meteor takes a more direct, coastal route between Selma and Savannah via Fayetteville, NC, Florence, SC, and Charleston, SC, while the Silver Star travels inland to serve the Carolinas' two state capitals, Raleigh, NC and Columbia, SC. At Auburndale, FL, the Silver Star continues west to service Lakeland, FL and Tampa, FL, while the Silver Meteor turns south to go directly to Miami. Amtrak's Palmetto operates over the Silver Meteor's, route between New York City and Savannah.

The two trains were inherited from the Seaboard Coast Line Railroad, which originally inherited them from the Seaboard Air Line Railroad, when Amtrak took over most intercity rail service in 1971. They are the sole remnants of numerous long-distance trains that ran between the Northeast and Florida for most of the 20th century. Amtrak originally applied the  Florida Fleet brand to the Silver Meteor, Silver Star, and the now-discontinued Champion, another train inherited from SCL, in the 1970's.

Prior to 1979, the Silver Meteor travelled between Savannah and Jacksonville, FL via the Seaboard Coast Line's Everett Subdivision with a stop at Thalmann, GA for Brunswick, GA. The train was rerouted via Jesup, GA in late 1979 along the same route as the Silver Star after SCL wanted to abandon the Everett Subdivision. Similarly, the Silver Star ran between Petersburg, VA and Raleigh via the Norlina Subdivision, with a stop at Henderson, NC, until 1985. When CSX, corporate successor of Seaboard Coast Line, abandoned the line between Petersburg and Norlina, NC in 1985, the Silver Star was rerouted via Selma en route to Raleigh. Currently, under the Southeast High Speed Rail Corridor plan, the Norlina Subdivision will be rebuilt between Petersburg and Norlina, with both the Silver Star and Amtrak's Charlotte, NC - New York Carolinian being rerouted over the line, with the stop at Henderson being reinstated, as well as a new stop being added at La Crosse, VA. 

Starting in 1982, Amtrak operated a service called the Silver Palm between Miami and Tampa. This was later discontinued in 1985 due to low ridership. Between 1996 and 2002, the Palmetto was renamed Silver Palm, and operated from New York – Miami.

See also 
 Silver Comet

References

External links 

 Official site

Amtrak routes
Long distance Amtrak routes